HC Motor-Politehnika Zaporizhzhia (formerly HC ZNTU-ZAB Zaporizhzhia) is a Ukrainian men's handball club based in Zaporizhzhia played in the Ukrainian Men's Handball Super League. It took part in the 2016–17 EHF Challenge Cup.

European record

Team

Current squad 
Squad for the 2016–17 season

Goalkeepers
 Rudolf Borodai
 Anton Terekhov 
 Maxym Voliuvach

Wingers
RW
  Vitaliy Gorbachov 
  Eduard Kravchenko
  Oleksandr Lykhina
LW 
  Mykhailo Bielous
  Oleksandr Kasai
Line players 
  Dmytro Ilchenko
  Ihor Skyba

Back players
LB
  Dmytro Horiha 
  Leonid Mykhailiutenko
CB 
  Vladyslav Kobzii
  Vladyslav Parovinchak 
RB
  Bogdan Cherkashchenko
  Bohdan Vichelkovskiy

References

External links
 Official site

ZNTU-ZAB Zaporozhye
ZNTU-ZAB Zaporozhye